The 2021 San Francisco Giants season was the 139th season for the franchise in Major League Baseball, their 64th year in San Francisco, and their 22nd at Oracle Park. It was the Giants' second season under manager Gabe Kapler, who managed his first 162-game season with the club (after the 2020 season was shortened to 60 games because of the COVID-19 pandemic), and he led them to the best record in the league. 

On September 13, the Giants clinched a spot in the postseason for the first time since 2016, and became the first team to clinch a spot in the 2021 postseason. On September 29, the Giants won their 104th game of the season, which set a San Francisco era record for most wins in a season. On October 3, the Giants won the National League West division title. It was their 9th division title in franchise history, and their first since 2012. It was also their 107th win of the season, which set a new franchise record for most wins in a season. It broke the previous record of 106 wins set by the 1904 New York Giants. 

In the 2021 regular season, the Giants' batters led the National League in home runs (241), slugging percentage (.440), OPS (.769), intentional walks (45), pitches per plate appearance (3.99), stolen base percentage (83%), and pull percentage (30.2%). They hit 18 pinch-hit home runs, a major league record. Of all NL teams, they had the highest batting average (.280), on-base percentage (.368), slugging percentage (.461), and OPS (.829) from the catcher position, the highest slugging percentage (.588) and OPS (.969) from the first base position, and the most RBIs from the shortstop position (108). They were second in the NL in runs (804), RBIs (768), walks (602), and batting average (.249).

The team's pitchers led the NL in fewest home runs (151), fewest walks (416), and strikeouts/walk (3.43). They tied for the league lead with 56 saves and fewest hit batters (63).

Manager Gabe Kapler began the 2021 season with a coaching staff of 13 that included nine who had never been on a major league staff before he hired them, and most of them were young enough to be playing themselves. In the 2021 regular season, his Giants winning percentage rose from .483 to .660, the 12 overturns caused by his challenges were tied for the most in the majors, and he was one of only two managers who were not ejected during the season. He used more pinch hitters per game than any other major league manager for the second season in a row  (2.60), and the second-most pitchers per game (4.7). 

The Giants lost in five games to the Los Angeles Dodgers in the 2021 National League Division Series.

Kapler was named the Sporting News 2021 NL Manager of the Year.

Offseason
 January 14, 2021 − The Giants signed LHP Alex Wood to a one-year contract.
 February 4, 2021 − The Giants signed INF Tommy La Stella to a three-year contract.
 February 4, 2021 – The Giants acquired OF LaMonte Wade in a trade with the Minnesota Twins in exchange for RHP Shaun Anderson.
The Giants participated in the Cactus League during spring training. The team won 11 and lost 12 of their 28 games; the remaining 5 games were tied and not included in the standings.

Regular season
For the 12th consecutive year, the Giants started their season on the road. They began 2021 against the Seattle Mariners, the first time that either team had opened a season with an interleague game. Evan Longoria and Buster Posey became only the second pair of Giants teammates—after Benito Santiago and Ray Durham in 2003—to homer in each of the team's first two games of a season since at least 1901.
In mid-April the Giants shut out the Miami Marlins and Philadelphia Phillies in consecutive games, marking the club's first back-to-back team shutouts since September 2018.

Facing the Colorado Rockies at Coors Field, the Giants scored 10 runs in the first inning for the first time since 1967.

The Giants came back from a 7–0 deficit to beat the Arizona Diamondbacks in mid-June. Mike Yastrzemski hit a grand slam into McCovey Cove and he and Steven Duggar became the first pair of Giants teammates to each get a splash hit home run in the same game.

Season standings

National League West

National League division standings

Record vs. opponents

Game log

|- style="background:#fbb;"
| 1 || April 1 || @ Mariners || 7–8  || Misiewicz (1–0) || Álvarez (0–1) || — || 8,174 || 0–1
|- style="background:#bfb;"
| 2 || April 2 || @ Mariners || 6–3 || Peralta (1–0) || Steckenrider (0–1) || McGee (1) || 8,392 || 1–1
|- style="background:#fbb;"
| 3 || April 3 || @ Mariners || 0–4 || Flexen (1–0) || Webb (0–1) || Montero (1) || 8,651 || 1–2
|- style="background:#bfb;"
| 4 || April 5 || @ Padres || 3–2 || Baragar (1–0) || Stammen (0–1) || McGee (2) || 10,350 || 2–2
|- style="background:#fbb;"
| 5 || April 6 || @ Padres || 1–3 || Kela (1–0) || Wisler (0–1) || Melancon (3) || 10,350 || 2–3
|- style="background:#bfb;"
| 6 || April 7 || @ Padres || 3–2  || McGee (1–0) || Hill (0–1) || Peralta (1) || 10,350 || 3–3
|- style="background:#bfb;"
| 7 || April 9 || Rockies || 3–1 || Cueto (1–0) || Gomber (0–2) || McGee (3) || 7,390 || 4–3
|- style="background:#bfb;"
| 8 || April 10 || Rockies || 4–3 || Baragar (2–0) || Bowden (0–2) || McGee (4) || 6,176 || 5–3
|- style="background:#bfb;"
| 9 || April 11 || Rockies || 4–0 || DeSclafani (1–0) || Márquez (0–1) || — || 6,560 || 6–3
|- style="background:#fbb;"
| 10 || April 12 || Reds || 0–3 || Miley (2–0) || Sanchez (0–1) || Sims (1) || 3,662 || 6–4
|- style="background:#bfb;"
| 11 || April 13 || Reds || 7–6 || Peralta (2–0) || Pérez (1–1) || McGee (5) || 3,673 || 7–4
|- style="background:#bfb;"
| 12 || April 14 || Reds || 3–0 || Cueto (2–0) || Mahle (1–1) || McGee (6) || 6,409 || 8–4
|- style="background:#fbb;"
| 13 || April 16 || @ Marlins || 1–4 || Bass (1–2) || Wisler (0–2) || García (3) || 5,734 || 8–5
|- style="background:#fbb;"
| 14 || April 17 || @ Marlins || 6–7  || García (2–1) || García (0–1) || — || 6,014 || 8–6
|- style="background:#bfb;"
| 15 || April 18 || @ Marlins || 1–0 || Wood (1–0) || López (0–2) || Rogers (1) || 6,129 || 9–6
|- style="background:#bfb;"
| 16 || April 19 || @ Phillies || 2–0 || Gausman (1–0) || Anderson (0–2) || Peralta (2) || 9,510 || 10–6
|- style="background:#bfb;"
| 17 || April 20 || @ Phillies || 10–7 || Álvarez (1–1) || Brogdon (3–1) || — || 10,584 || 11–6
|- style="background:#fbb;"
| 18 || April 21 || @ Phillies || 5–6 || Neris (1–1) || Peralta (2–1) || — || 9,537 || 11–7
|- style="background:#bfb;"
| 19 || April 22 || Marlins || 3–0 || Sanchez (1–1) || Castano (0–1) || McGee (7) || 4,580 || 12–7
|- style="background:#bfb;"
| 20 || April 23 || Marlins || 5–3 || Wood (2–0) || Alcántara (0–2) || — || 6,657 || 13–7
|- style="background:#fbb;"
| 21 || April 24 || Marlins || 2–5 || Floro (1–1) || Santos (0–1) || — || 8,282 || 13–8
|- style="background:#bfb;"
| 22 || April 25 || Marlins || 4–3 || Webb (1–1) || Campbell (0–1) || Rogers (2) || 7,572 || 14–8
|- style="background:#bfb;"
| 23 || April 26 || Rockies || 12–0 || DeSclafani (2–0) || Gomber (1–3) || — || 4,129 || 15–8
|- style="background:#fbb;"
| 24 || April 27 || Rockies || 5–7  || Bard (1–1) || Santos (0–2) || Estévez (1) || 5,595 || 15–9
|- style="background:#bfb;"
| 25 || April 28 || Rockies || 7–3 || Wood (3–0) || Márquez (1–2) || — || 6,163 || 16–9
|- style="background:#fbb;"
| 26 || April 30 || @ Padres || 2–3 || Darvish (3–1) || Webb (1–2) || Melancon (9) || 15,250 || 16–10
|-

|- style="background:#fbb;"
| 27 || May 1 || @ Padres || 2–6 || Snell (1–0) || DeSclafani (2–1) || — || 15,250 || 16–11
|- style="background:#bfb;"
| 28 || May 2 || @ Padres || 7–1 || Gausman (2–0) || Musgrove (2–3) || — || 15,250 || 17–11
|- style="background:#bbb;"
| – || May 3 || @ Rockies || colspan=8 | Postponed (Rain; Makeup: May 4)
|- style="background:#bfb;"
| 29 || May 4  || @ Rockies || 12–4  || Wisler (1–2) || Márquez (1–3) || — || 10,213 || 18–11
|- style="background:#fbb;"
| 30 || May 4  || @ Rockies || 6–8  || Bowden (1–2) || Doval (0–1) || — || 10,213 || 18–12
|- style="background:#fbb;"
| 31 || May 5 || @ Rockies || 5–6 || Gray (4–2) || Webb (1–3) || Bard (3) || 9,521 || 18–13
|- style="background:#bfb;"
| 32 || May 7 || Padres || 5–4 || Doval (1–1) || Kela (2–2) || McGee (8) || 9,219 || 19–13
|- style="background:#bfb;"
| 33 || May 8 || Padres || 7–1 || Gausman (3–0) || Musgrove (2–4) || — || 9,764 || 20–13
|- style="background:#fbb;"
| 34 || May 9 || Padres || 1–11 || Weathers (2–1) || Cueto (2–1) || — || 10,008 || 20–14
|- style="background:#bfb;"
| 35 || May 10 || Rangers || 3–1 || Wood (4–0) || King (4–2) || McGee (9) || 7,450 || 21–14
|- style="background:#bfb;"
| 36 || May 11 || Rangers || 4–2 || Webb (2–3) || Lyles (1–3) || McGee (10) || 7,268 || 22–14
|- style="background:#bfb;"
| 37 || May 13 || @ Pirates || 3–1 || DeSclafani (3–1) || Crowe (0–2) || Rogers (3) || 4,099 || 23–14
|- style="background:#fbb;"
| 38 || May 14 || @ Pirates || 2–3  || Oviedo (1–1) || Baragar (2–1) || — || 6,743 || 23–15
|- style="background:#fbb;"
| 39 || May 15 || @ Pirates || 6–8 || Rodríguez (2–0) || McGee (1–1) || — || 7,833 || 23–16
|- style="background:#bfb;"
| 40 || May 16 || @ Pirates || 4–1 || Wood (5–0) || Keller (2–5) || Rogers (4) || 7,356 || 24–16
|- style="background:#bfb;"
| 41 || May 17 || @ Reds || 6–3 || Webb (3–3) || Gray (0–3) || Rogers (5) || 11,004 || 25–16
|- style="background:#bfb;"
| 42 || May 18 || @ Reds || 4–2 || DeSclafani (4–1) || Castillo (1–6) || McGee (11) || 8,745 || 26–16
|- style="background:#bfb;"
| 43 || May 19 || @ Reds || 4–0 || Gausman (4–0) || Miley (4–4) || — || 10,326 || 27–16 
|- style="background:#bfb;"
| 44 || May 20 || @ Reds || 19–4 || Cueto (3–1) || Mahle (2–2) || — || 11,656 || 28–16
|- style="background:#fbb;"
| 45 || May 21 || Dodgers || 1–2 || Bauer (5–2) || Wood (5–1) || Treinen (2) || 12,753 || 28–17
|- style="background:#fbb;"
| 46 || May 22 || Dodgers || 3–6 || Buehler (3–0) || Kazmir (0–1) || Jansen (11) || 13,660 || 28–18
|- style="background:#fbb;"
| 47 || May 23 || Dodgers || 5–11 || Urías (7–1) || DeSclafani (4–2) || — || 13,346 || 28–19
|- style="background:#bfb;"
| 48 || May 25 || @ Diamondbacks || 8–0 || Gausman (5–0) || Martin (0–2) || — || 10,311 || 29–19
|- style="background:#bfb;"
| 49 || May 26 || @ Diamondbacks || 5–4 || Tropeano (1–0) || Young (1–4) || Rogers (6) || 8,597 || 30–19
|- style="background:#fbb;"
| 50 || May 27 || @ Dodgers || 3–4 || González (2–0) || Wood (5–2) || Jansen (12) || 16,343 || 30–20
|- style="background:#bfb;"
| 51 || May 28 || @ Dodgers || 8–5  || Rogers (1–0) || Jansen (0–2) || García (1) || 17,873 || 31–20
|- style="background:#bfb;"
| 52 || May 29 || @ Dodgers || 11–6 || Webb (4–3) || Urías (7–2) || — || 19,097 || 32–20
|- style="background:#bfb;"
| 53 || May 30 || @ Dodgers || 5–4 || Gausman (6–0) || Kershaw (7–4) || McGee (12) || 18,155 || 33–20
|- style="background:#bfb;"
| 54 || May 31 || Angels || 6–1 || Cueto (4–1) || Bundy (0–6) || — || 13,144 || 34–20
|-

|- style="background:#fbb;"
| 55 || June 1 || Angels || 1–8 || Heaney (3–3) || Wood (5–3) || — || 10,546 || 34–21
|- style="background:#bfb;"
| 56 || June 3 || Cubs || 7–2 || DeSclafani (5–2) || Davies (2–3) || — || 10,737 || 35–21
|- style="background:#bfb;"
| 57 || June 4 || Cubs || 8–5 || Menez (1–0) || Arrieta (5–6) || Rogers (7) || 11,524 || 36–21
|- style="background:#bfb;"
| 58 || June 5 || Cubs || 4–3 || Gausman (7–0) || Stewart (1–1) || Rogers (8) || 12,792 || 37–21
|- style="background:#fbb;"
| 59 || June 6 || Cubs || 3–4 || Hendricks (7–4) || Cueto (4–2) || Kimbrel (14) || 14,089 || 37–22
|- style="background:#bfb;"
| 60 || June 8 || @ Rangers || 9–4 || Álvarez (2–1) || Rodríguez (1–3) || — || 24,938 || 38–22
|- style="background:#fbb;"
| 61 || June 9 || @ Rangers || 3–4  || Martin (1–2) || McGee (1–2) || — || 25,803 || 38–23
|- style="background:#bbb;"
| — || June 10 || @ Nationals || colspan=8 | Postponed (Rain; Makeup: June 12)
|- style="background:#bfb;"
| 62 || June 11 || @ Nationals || 1–0 || DeSclafani (6–2) || Espino (0–2) || — || 18,029 || 39–23
|- style="background:#fbb;"
| 63 || June 12  || @ Nationals || 0–2  || Fedde (4–4) || Gausman (7–1) || Hand (11) || 16,425 || 39–24
|- style="background:#bfb;"
| 64 || June 12  || @ Nationals || 2–1  || McGee (2–2) || Finnegan (2–2) || Baragar (1) || 24,066 || 40–24
|- style="background:#fbb;"
| 65 || June 13 || @ Nationals || 0–5 || Ross (3–6) || Cueto (4–3) || — || 21,569 || 40–25
|- style="background:#bfb;"
| 66 || June 14 || Diamondbacks || 5–2 || Wood (6–3) || Peacock (2–4) || McGee (13) || 9,906 || 41–25
|- style="background:#bfb;"
| 67 || June 15 || Diamondbacks || 9–8 || Sherfy (1–0) || Castellanos (0–1) || Rogers (9) || 9,867 || 42–25
|- style="background:#bfb;"
| 68 || June 16 || Diamondbacks || 13–7 || DeSclafani (7–2) || Kelly (2–7) || — || 11,004 || 43–25
|- style="background:#bfb;"
| 69 || June 17 || Diamondbacks || 10–3 || Gausman (8–1) || Gallen (1–2) || — || 13,144 || 44–25
|- style="background:#bfb;"
| 70 || June 18 || Phillies || 5–3 || Cueto (5–3) || Velasquez (2–2) || McGee (14) || 16,170 || 45–25
|- style="background:#fbb;"
| 71 || June 19 || Phillies || 6–13 || Suárez (3–1) || García (0–2) || — || 16,774 || 45–26
|- style="background:#bfb;"
| 72 || June 20 || Phillies || 11–2 || Long (1–0) || Eflin (2–6) || — || 18,265 || 46–26
|- style="background:#bfb;"
| 73 || June 22 || @ Angels || 5–0 || DeSclafani (8–2) || Heaney (4–5) || — || 28,354 || 47–26
|- style="background:#bfb;"
| 74 || June 23 || @ Angels || 9–3  || Leone (1–0) || Claudio (1–2) || — || 20,620 || 48–26
|- style="background:#bfb;"
| 75 || June 25 || Athletics || 2–0 || Cueto (6–3) || Manaea (6–4) || McGee (15) || 36,928 || 49–26
|- style="background:#bfb;"
| 76 || June 26 || Athletics || 6–5  || McGee (3–2) || Smith (1–1) || — || 33,168 || 50–26
|- style="background:#fbb;"
| 77 || June 27 || Athletics || 2–6 || Irvin (6–7) || Long (1–1) || — || 35,920 || 50–27
|- style="background:#fbb;"
| 78 || June 28 || @ Dodgers || 2–3 || Bauer (8–5) || DeSclafani (8–3) || Jansen (19) || 47,835 || 50–28
|- style="background:#fbb;"
| 79 || June 29 || @ Dodgers || 1–3 || Buehler (8–1) || Gausman (8–2) || Jansen (20) || 52,342 || 50–29
|-

|- style="background:#fbb;"
| 80 || July 1 || @ Diamondbacks || 3–5 || Kelly (5–7) || Cueto (6–4) || Soria (1) || 9,172 || 50–30
|- style="background:#bfb;"
| 81 || July 2 || @ Diamondbacks || 11–4 || Wood (7–3) || Gallen (1–4) || — || 12,262 || 51–30
|- style="background:#bfb;"
| 82 || July 3 || @ Diamondbacks || 6–5 || Leone (2–0) || Buchter (0–2) || McGee (16) || 23,689 || 52–30
|- style="background:#bfb;"
| 83 || July 4 || @ Diamondbacks || 5–2 || DeSclafani (9–3) || Smith (2–5) || Rogers (10) || 27,032 || 53–30
|- style="background:#fbb;"
| 84 || July 5 || Cardinals || 3–5 || Kim (3–5) || Gausman (8–3) || — || 32,644 || 53–31
|- style="background:#fbb;"
| 85 || July 6 || Cardinals || 5–6 || Wainwright (7–5) || Cueto (6–5) || Miller (1) || 18,785 || 53–32
|- style="background:#bfb;"
| 86 || July 7 || Cardinals || 5–2 || Wood (8–3) || Oviedo (0–5) || McGee (17) || 19,067 || 54–32 
|- style="background:#bfb;"
| 87 || July 9 || Nationals || 5–3 || García (1–2) || Clay (0–3) || McGee (18) || 27,345 || 55–32 
|- style="background:#bfb;"
| 88 || July 10 || Nationals || 10–4 || DeSclafani (10–3) || Lester (2–4) || — || 25,901 || 56–32 
|- style="background:#bfb;" 
| 89 || July 11 || Nationals || 3–1 || Gausman (9–3) || Fedde (4–6) || McGee (19) || 26,639 || 57–32 
|-style=background:#bbbfff
| – || July 13 || colspan="8"|91st All-Star Game in Denver, CO
|- style="background:#bfb;"
| 90 || July 16 || @ Cardinals || 7–2 || Jackson (1–0) || Wainwright (7–6) || — || 33,743 || 58–32 
|- style="background:#fbb;"
| 91 || July 17 || @ Cardinals || 1–3 || Kim (5–5) || DeSclafani (10–4) || Reyes (21) || 40,489 || 58–33 
|- style="background:#fbb;"
| 92 || July 18 || @ Cardinals || 1–2 || Cabrera (2–3) || Brebbia (0–1) || Reyes (22) || 29,425 || 58–34
|- style="background:#bfb;"
| 93 || July 19 || @ Dodgers || 7–2 || García (2–2) || Gonsolin (1–1) || — || 50,970 || 59–34 
|- style="background:#fbb;"
| 94 || July 20 || @ Dodgers || 6–8 || Sherfy (2–0) || Rogers (1–1) || — || 42,344 || 59–35 
|- style="background:#bfb;"
| 95 || July 21 || @ Dodgers || 4–2 || Álvarez (3–1) || Jansen (1–3) || Rogers (11) || 52,076 || 60–35 
|- style="background:#bfb;"
| 96 || July 22 || @ Dodgers || 5–3 || Álvarez (4–1) || Jansen (1–4) || McGee (20) || 47,312 || 61–35
|- style="background:#fbb;"
| 97 || July 23 || Pirates || 4–6 || Stratton (3–0) || Leone (2–1) || Rodríguez (14) || 26,579 || 61–36 
|- style="background:#fbb;"
| 98 || July 24 || Pirates || 2–10 || Crowe (2–5) || Gausman (9–4) || — || 30,780 || 61–37
|- style="background:#bfb;"
| 99 || July 25 || Pirates || 6–1 || Wood (9–3) || Brubaker (4–10) || — || 30,303 || 62–37 
|- style="background:#bfb;"
| 100 || July 27 || Dodgers || 2–1 || Rogers (2–1) || Treinen (2–5) || McGee (21) || 32,878 || 63–37 
|- style="background:#fbb;"
| 101 || July 28 || Dodgers || 0–8 || Buehler (11–1) || DeSclafani (10–5) || — || 33,728 || 63–38 
|- style="background:#bfb;"
| 102 || July 29 || Dodgers || 5–0 || Cueto (7–5) || Price (4–1) || — || 35,136 || 64–38 
|- style="background:#fbb;"
| 103 || July 30 || Astros || 6–9 || Valdez (7–2) || Gausman (9–5) || — || 28,020 || 64–39 
|- style="background:#bfb;"
| 104 || July 31 || Astros || 8–6 || Jackson (2–0) || Taylor (2–3) || McGee (22) || 27,324 || 65–39
|-

|- style="background:#bfb;"
| 105 || August 1 || Astros || 5–3 || Webb (5–3) || García (7–6) || McGee (23) || 29,655 || 66–39
|- style="background:#bfb;"
| 106 || August 2 || @ Diamondbacks || 11–8  || García (3–2) || Aguilar (0–1) || — || 8,904 || 67–39
|- style="background:#fbb;"
| 107 || August 3 || @ Diamondbacks || 1–3 || Bumgarner (6–6) || Cueto (7–6) || Clippard (2) || 8,809 || 67–40
|- style="background:#bfb;"
| 108 || August 4 || @ Diamondbacks || 7–1 || Gausman (10–5) || Gallen (1–6) || — || 8,091 || 68–40
|- style="background:#bfb;"
| 109 || August 5 || @ Diamondbacks || 5–4  || Rogers (3–1) || Gilbert (0–1) || McGee (24) || 8,773 || 69–40
|- style="background:#fbb;"
| 110 || August 6 || @ Brewers || 1–2  || Suter (11–5) || García (3–3) || — || 33,250 || 69–41 
|- style="background:#bfb;"
| 111 || August 7 || @ Brewers || 9–6  || García (4–3) || Romano (0–1) || — || 34,155 || 70–41 
|- style="background:#bfb;"
| 112 || August 8 || @ Brewers || 5–4 || Watson (4–3) || Boxberger (4–3) || Littell (1) || 38,597 || 71–41 
|- style="background:#bfb;"
| 113 || August 10 || Diamondbacks || 8–7 || Littell (1–0) || Peacock (5–7) || — || 23,802 || 72–41 
|- style="background:#bfb;"
| 114 || August 11 || Diamondbacks || 7–2 || Gausman (11–5) || Kelly (7–9) || — || 20,037 || 73–41
|- style="background:#bfb;"
| 115 || August 12 || Rockies || 7–0 || Webb (6–3) || Márquez (10–9) || — || 24,295 || 74–41
|- style="background:#bfb;"
| 116 || August 13 || Rockies || 5–4 || DeSclafani (11–5) || Gomber (9–7) || Littell (2) || 36,126 || 75–41 
|- style="background:#fbb;" 
| 117 || August 14 || Rockies || 1–4 || Freeland (4–6) || Leone (2–2) || Bard (19) || 32,282 || 75–42
|- style="background:#bfb;"
| 118 || August 15 || Rockies || 5–2 || Wood (10–3) || Gray (7–9) || McGee (25) || 33,337 || 76–42 
|- style="background:#bfb;"
| 119 || August 16 || Mets || 7–5 || Gausman (12–5) || Castro (3–4) || McGee (26) || 23,511 || 77–42
|- style="background:#bfb;"
| 120 || August 17 || Mets || 3–2 || Webb (7–3) || Stroman (8–12) || Leone (1) || 23,610 || 78–42 
|- style="background:#fbb;"
| 121 || August 18 || Mets || 2–6  || Familia (7–3) || Chatwood (1–3) || — || 25,360 || 78–43
|- style="background:#fbb;"
| 122 || August 20 || @ Athletics || 1–4 || Kaprielian (7–4) || Wood (10–4) || Trivino (21) || 40,133 || 78–44 
|- style="background:#bfb;"
| 123 || August 21 || @ Athletics || 6–5 || Rogers (4–1) || Trivino (5–5) || McGee (27) || 36,230 || 79–44
|- style="background:#bfb;"
| 124 || August 22 || @ Athletics || 2–1 || Leone (3–2) || Puk (0–1) || McGee (28) || 30,345 || 80–44 
|- style="background:#bfb;"
| 125 || August 24 || @ Mets || 8–0 || Long (2–1) || Megill (1–3) || — || 28,558 || 81–44 
|- style="background:#bfb;"
| 126 || August 25 || @ Mets || 3–2 || Watson (5–3) || Walker (7–9) || McGee (29) || 24,384 || 82–44 
|- style="background:#bfb;"
| 127 || August 26 || @ Mets || 3–2 || García (5–3) || Lugo (3–2) || Rogers (12) || 25,000 || 83–44
|- style="background:#fbb;"
| 128 || August 27 || @ Braves || 5–6 || Minter (2–4) || Watson (5–4) || Smith (29) || 35,586 || 83–45 
|- style="background:#bfb;"
| 129 || August 28 || @ Braves || 5–0 || Webb (8–3) || Ynoa (4–4) || — || 39,558 || 84–45
|- style="background:#fbb;"
| 130 || August 29 || @ Braves || 0–9 || Anderson (6–5) || DeSclafani (11–6) || — || 28,820 || 84–46
|- style="background:#fbb;"
| 131 || August 30 || Brewers || 1–3 || Burnes (9–4) || Álvarez (4–2) || Hader (28) || 23,154 || 84–47 
|- style="background:#fbb;"
| 132 || August 31 || Brewers || 2–6 || Woodruff (9–7) || Cueto (7–7) || — || 20,897 || 84–48 
|-

|- style="background:#fbb;"
| 133 || September 1 || Brewers || 2–5 || Norris (2–3) || Leone (3–3) || Hader (29) || 21,189 || 84–49
|- style="background:#bfb;"
| 134 || September 2 || Brewers || 5–1 || Rogers (5–1) || Williams (7–2) || — || 21,023 || 85–49
|- style="background:#bfb;"
| 135 || September 3 || Dodgers || 3–2  || García (6–3) || Phillips (1–1) || — || 39,338 || 86–49
|- style="background:#fbb;"
| 136 || September 4 || Dodgers || 1–6 || Urías (16–3) || Jackson (2–1) || — || 41,146 || 86–50
|- style="background:#bfb;"
| 137 || September 5 || Dodgers || 6–4 || Littell (2–0) || Buehler (13–3) || — || 41,155 || 87–50
|- style="background:#bfb;"
| 138 || September 6 || @ Rockies || 10–5 || Gausman (13–5) || Freeland (5–7) || — || 27,967 || 88–50
|- style="background:#bfb;"
| 139 || September 7 || @ Rockies || 12–3 || Webb (9–3) || Gonzalez (3–7) || — || 24,387 || 89–50
|- style="background:#bfb;"
| 140 || September 8 || @ Rockies || 7–4 || Rogers (6–1) || Estévez (2–4) || McGee (30) || 20,358 || 90–50
|- style="background:#bfb;"
| 141 || September 10 || @ Cubs || 6–1 || Doval (2–1) || Megill (1–1) || — || 29,439 || 91–50
|- style="background:#bfb;"
| 142 || September 11 || @ Cubs || 15–4 || Gausman (14–5) || Davies (6–11) || Baragar (2) || 34,723 || 92–50
|- style="background:#bfb;"
| 143 || September 12 || @ Cubs || 6–5 || Webb (10–3) || Steele (3–3) || McGee (31) || 32,021 || 93–50
|- style="background:#bfb;"
| 144 || September 13 || Padres || 9–1 || Littell (3–0) || Darvish (8–10) || — || 21,078 || 94–50
|- style="background:#bfb;"
| 145 || September 14 || Padres || 6–1 || DeSclafani (12–6) || Arrieta (5–13) || — || 23,192 || 95–50
|- style="background:#fbb;"
| 146 || September 15 || Padres || 6–9 || Musgrove (11–9) || Leone (3–4) || — || 21,212 || 95–51
|- style="background:#fbb;"
| 147 || September 16 || Padres || 4–7 || Crismatt (3–1) || Gausman (14–6) || — || 23,379 || 95–52
|- style="background:#bfb;"
| 148 || September 17 || Braves || 6–5  || Doval (3–1) || Webb (4–3) || — || 26,644 || 96–52
|- style="background:#bfb;"
| 149 || September 18 || Braves || 2–0 || Littell (4–0) || Morton (13–6) || Leone (2) || 32,058 || 97–52
|- style="background:#fbb;"
| 150 || September 19 || Braves || 0–3 || Fried (12–7) || DeSclafani (12–7) || Smith (33) || 32,210 || 97–53
|- style="background:#bfb;"
| 151 || September 21 || @ Padres || 6–5 || Watson (6–4) || Melancon (4–3) || Rogers (13) || 36,439 || 98–53
|- style="background:#bfb;"
| 152 || September 22 || @ Padres || 8–6 || Doval (4–1) || Velasquez (3–8) || — || 38,189 || 99–53
|- style="background:#fbb;"
| 153 || September 23 || @ Padres || 6–7  || Detwiler (3–1) || Leone (3–5) || — || 31,049 || 99–54
|- style="background:#bfb;"
| 154 || September 24 || @ Rockies || 7–2 || Castro (1–0) || Goudeau (1–1) || — || 41,613 || 100–54
|- style="background:#bfb;"
| 155 || September 25 || @ Rockies || 7–2 || Watson (7–4)  || Gray (8–12) || — || 45,063 || 101–54
|- style="background:#bfb;"
| 156 || September 26 || @ Rockies || 6–2 || Doval (5–1) || Bard (7–8) || — || 31,043 || 102–54
|- style="background:#bfb;"
| 157 || September 28 || Diamondbacks || 6–4 || Álvarez (5–2) || Poppen (1–1) || Doval (1) || 28,122 || 103–54
|- style="background:#bfb;"
| 158 || September 29 || Diamondbacks || 1–0 || Leone (4–5) || Ramirez (0–2) || Doval (2) || 23,110 || 104–54
|- style="background:#bfb;"
| 159 || September 30 || Diamondbacks || 5–4 || Rogers (7–1) || Mantiply (0–3) || — || 27,503 || 105–54
|-

|- style="background:#bfb;"
| 160 || October 1 || Padres || 3–0 || DeSclafani (13–7) || Ávila (0–1) || Doval (3) || 33,975 || 106–54
|- style="background:#fbb;"
| 161 || October 2 || Padres || 2–3  || Hill (6–6) || Castro (1–1) || Melancon (39) || 40,760 || 106–55
|- style="background:#bfb;"
| 162 || October 3 || Padres || 11–4 || Webb (11–3) || Knehr (1–2) || — || 36,901 || 107–55
|-

Postseason

Game Log

|- style="background:#bfb;"
| 1 || October 8 || Dodgers || 4–0 || Webb (1–0) || Buehler (0–1) || – || 41,934 || 1–0
|- style="background:#fbb;"
| 2 || October 9 || Dodgers || 2–9 || Urías (1–0) || Gausman (0–1) || – || 42,275 || 1–1
|- style="background:#bfb;"
| 3 || October 11 || @ Dodgers || 1–0 || Rogers (1–0) || Scherzer (0–1) || Doval (1) || 53,299 || 2–1
|- style="background:#fbb;"
| 4 || October 12 || @ Dodgers || 2–7 || Kelly (1–0) || DeSclafani (0–1) || – || 52,935 || 2–2
|- style="background:#fbb;"
| 5 || October 14 || Dodgers || 1–2 || Jansen (1–0) || Doval (0–1) || Scherzer (1) || 42,275 || 2–3

|-

Postseason rosters

| style="text-align:left" |
Pitchers: 17 Jake McGee 26 Anthony DeSclafani 34 Kevin Gausman 46 Zack Littell 48 José Álvarez 52 Dominic Leone 57 Alex Wood 62 Logan Webb 66 Jarlin García 71 Tyler Rogers 75 Camilo Doval 76 Kervin Castro 
Catchers: 2 Curt Casali 28 Buster Posey 
Infielders: 7 Donovan Solano 10 Evan Longoria 18 Tommy La Stella 33 Darin Ruf 35 Brandon Crawford 41 Wilmer Flores 
Outfielders: 5 Mike Yastrzemski 6 Steven Duggar 12 Alex Dickerson 13 Austin Slater 23 Kris Bryant 31 LaMonte Wade Jr.
|- valign="top"

Roster

Statistics

BattingList does not include pitchers. Stats in bold are the team leaders.Note: G = Games played; AB = At bats; R = Runs; H = Hits; 2B = Doubles; 3B = Triples; HR = Home runs; RBI = Runs batted in; BB = Walks; SO = Strikeouts; SB = Stolen bases; AVG = Batting average; OBP = On-base percentage; SLG = Slugging percentage; OPS = On Base + SluggingPitchingList does not include position players. Stats in bold are the team leaders.Note: W = Wins; L = Losses; ERA = Earned run average; G = Games pitched; GS = Games started; SV = Saves; IP = Innings pitched; H = Hits allowed; R = Runs allowed; ER = Earned runs allowed; BB = Walks allowed; K = Strikeouts''

Farm system

Source:

References

External links
San Francisco Giants 2021 Schedule at MLB.com
2021 San Francisco Giants season at Baseball Reference

San Francisco Giants
San Francisco Giants seasons
2021 in San Francisco
San Francisco Giants
National League West champion seasons